Clóvis Pinheiro dos Santos (born 28 August 1937), known as just Clóvis, is a Brazilian footballer. He played in four matches for the Brazil national football team in 1959. He was also part of Brazil's squad for the 1959 South American Championship that took place in Ecuador.

References

External links
 

1937 births
Living people
Brazilian footballers
Brazil international footballers
Association football defenders
Sportspeople from Pernambuco